Hakkarainen is a Finnish surname. Notable people with the surname include:

Harri Hakkarainen (born 1969), Finnish javelin thrower
Teuvo Hakkarainen (born 1960), Finnish politician
 Pentti Ensio Hakkarainen, educational psychologist
 Pentti Kalevi Hakkarainen (born 1958), Finnish banker

Finnish-language surnames